Lương Văn Can (梁文玕, 1854–1927) was a Vietnamese mandarin, school administrator, independence activist and writer. His most noted work is Nhà nước, "The State".

References

Vietnamese Confucianists
Vietnamese nationalists
Vietnamese writers
Vietnamese merchants
1854 births
1927 deaths